Liam Wooding (born 25 May 1993) is an Australian footballer who plays for North Eastern MetroStars.

Club career

Adelaide United
In 2009, he signed a youth contract with A-League club Adelaide United. He made his professional debut in the 2011-12 A-League season on 23 March 2012 in a round 27 match against Melbourne Heart at the Hindmarsh Stadium.

Adelaide Galaxy
In 2010, he was loaned out to FFSA Super League club Adelaide Galaxy in the off season where he made 9 appearances for the senior team.

MetroStars
In February 2013, Wooding agreed to join South Australian club North Eastern MetroStars, agreeing to a two year deal.

References 

1993 births
Living people
Australian soccer players
Soccer players from Adelaide
FFSA Super League players
Adelaide United FC players
A-League Men players
Association football forwards
National Premier Leagues players
North Eastern MetroStars SC players